The Poetry Society of America's Robert H. Winner Memorial Award is given "by the family and friends of Robert H. Winner, whose first book of poems appeared when he was almost fifty years old. This award acknowledges original work being done in mid-career by a poet who has not had substantial recognition, and is open to poets over forty who have published no more than one book."  

Each winner receives a $2500 prize.

2017: Heather Altfeld, Judge: Fred Marchant
2016: Erin Redfern and Metta Sáma, Judge: Cyrus Cassells
2015: Karen Skolfield, Judge: Alan Shapiro
2014: Dore Kiesselbach, Judge: Alberto Rios
2013: Carol Light, Judge: David Wagoner
2012: Lise Goett, Judge: Toi Derricotte
2011: Kathy Nilsson, Judge: Timothy Donnelly
2010: Leslie Williams, Judge: David St. John
2009: Eliot Khalil Wilson, Judge: Henri Cole
2008: Jocelyn Emerson, Judge: Annie Finch
2007: Charlene Fix, Judge: Eleanor Wilner
2006: Daneen Wardrop, Judge: Jean Valentine
2005: Julie Sheehan, Judge: Sharon Olds
2004: John McKernan, Judge: Linda Gregg
2003: John Glowney and Rusty Morrison, Judge: Ron Padgett
2002: Margo Berdeshevsky, Judge: Marie Ponsot
2001: Alice Jones and Jeffrey Franklin

Notes

See also
 Poetry Society of America
 List of American literary awards
 List of poetry awards
 List of years in poetry

External links
  Poetry Society of America main awards Web page

American poetry awards
Awards established in 2001